Lasbordes is a commune in the Aude department in southern France. The village is known for its church : Saint-Christophe, classed as historical monument since July 26th 1988.

The Terreal company has a plant in the center of Lasbordes for the fabrication of bricks.

The village provides some infrastructures to its population with a public school, a small market, a soccer field and a city stadium.

Population

See also
Communes of the Aude department

References

Communes of Aude
Aude communes articles needing translation from French Wikipedia